The Martineau family is an intellectual, business and political dynasty associated first with Norwich and later also London and Birmingham, England. The family were prominent Unitarians; a room in London's Essex Hall, the headquarters building of the British Unitarians, was named after them. Martineau Place in Birmingham's Central Business District was named in their honour.

In Birmingham, several of its members have been Lord Mayor. They worshipped at the Church of the Messiah, where they mingled with other dynastic families of that denomination, such as the Kenricks and the Chamberlains, with much intermarriage occurring between them. Several of the Martineaus are buried in Key Hill Cemetery, either in the family vault or separately.

Huguenot beginnings
The Martineaus came from a Huguenot immigrant background, and were noted in the medical, intellectual and business fields. Gaston Martineau, a surgeon in Dieppe, moved to Norwich after the Revocation of the Edict of Nantes of 1685. Initially Calvinist dissenters, they raised their children to be bilingual in French and English.

Becoming established in Norwich
 
Gaston's grandson David Martineau II (1726–1768) was the third generation of surgeons, and had five sons who made up the male line of Martineaus. By the fourth generation the family was divided into Anglicans and Unitarians.

The eldest of the five sons was Philip Meadows Martineau (1752–1829). A surgeon, Martineau was "one of the most distinguished lithotomists of his day". Apprenticed to the surgeon William Donne, who was noted for skill in lithotomy, he studied medicine at several universities, then returned in 1777 to become Donne's partner, and carried on his speciality. Henry Herbert Southey was his student. He had one daughter. In 1793 he purchased the Bracondale Woods on the outskirts of Norwich and in 1811 the adjacent property of Carrow Abbey. He built Bracondale Hall, described in 1847 as a "handsome mansion with pleasure grounds delightfully laid out". From the ruins of Carrow Abbey, Martineau also constructed on his estate a "small gothic priory with windows of ancient stained glass". By 1879, this estate, including the Manor of Carrow, had been sold following the death of Martineau's unmarried daughter Frances Anne.

The second son, David Martineau (1754–1840), had four sons and six daughters and the third, Peter Finch Martineau (1755–1847), had four sons and two daughters. The fourth son, John Martineau of Stamford Hill, had 14 children, including John Martineau, the engineer. The three brothers conducted business together in London. The fifth son, Thomas, is mentioned below.

Thomas Martineau and family
Thomas Martineau (1764–1826), a manufacturer of textiles, was the fifth son of David Martineau II. He spent his life in Norwich, where he was a deacon of its Unitarian church, the Octagon Chapel, from 1797. He married Elizabeth Rankin (8 October 1772 – 26 August 1848), who had her portrait painted a year before her death by a member of the Bonham Carter family. The couple had eight children. Thomas died on 21 June 1826 and is buried at Rosary Cemetery, the first non-denominational burial ground in the United Kingdom.

Thomas and Elizabeth Martineau's eldest child was a daughter, Elizabeth (1794–1850), who married Dr Thomas Greenhow, a reforming doctor in Newcastle, co-founder of the city's eye infirmary. The Greenhows' daughter Frances married into the Lupton family of Leeds. Frances was an educationalist and worked to expand educational opportunities for girls.

Their eldest son was Thomas (1795–1824), a surgeon who also founded an eye infirmary, now part of the Norfolk and Norwich Hospital.

Another son, Robert (1798–1870), became a magistrate, town councillor and then Mayor of Birmingham in 1846. He married Jane Smith (died 1874). He hired John Barnsley to build a mansion in Edgbaston, with a large wing for his mother, who lived there till her death in 1848, and another for his own family. Barnsley had already built most of Birmingham's grand Victorian and Edwardian public buildings.

Their best known child was their sixth, Harriet (1802–1876), the political author and a pioneer sociologist. She sometimes stayed with her widowed mother and her brother Robert, including during his mayoral tenure. The three of them, and other members of the family, are buried together in the Martineau vault at the Key Hill Cemetery, Birmingham.

Their seventh child, James (1805–1900), was a religious philosopher and a professor at Manchester New College. He was a guest teacher in Liverpool where his sister, Rachel (1800–1876), ran a private girls' school which was attended by Elizabeth Gaskell's daughters. James's daughter was the watercolourist Edith Martineau (1842–1909).

Sir Thomas Martineau and family

Sir Thomas Martineau (4 November 1828 – 28 July 1893) was the son of Robert and Jane Martineau, born on the family estate on Bristol Road, now Martineau Gardens. He married Emily Kenrick (1838–1899), whose family was also part of Liberal Birmingham politics. Emily was the sister of Florence (1847–1875), whose marriage to Joseph Chamberlain bore a son, Neville, who became prime minister. Emily was also the cousin of William Kenrick MP.

Joseph Chamberlain was then the Leader of the Liberal Unionists, and with his assistance Sir Thomas was instrumental in getting the Welsh Water Bill through Parliament and getting Birmingham made an assizes town. Like his father, Sir Thomas was also Mayor of Birmingham, holding office from 1884 to 1887, the year Queen Victoria was received by him when opening Birmingham's Victoria Law Courts. He was subsequently invited later in 1887 to Windsor Castle where he was knighted by the Queen.  He died on 28 July 1893 and is buried alongside his family at Key Hill Cemetery. Colonel Ernest Martineau (1861–1952), son of Sir Thomas, was Lord Mayor of Birmingham between 1912 and 1914; his first cousin, Neville Chamberlain, replacing him in this role in 1915.

Robert Francis (16 May 1831 – 15 December 1909), brother of Sir Thomas, was an alderman, secretary of the Birmingham and Midland Institute, chairman of the Technical School committee, trustee to Mason Science College, and then a member of the council of its successor institution, the University of Birmingham. He and his family were the third generation of Martineaus to live at Highfield Road, Kings Norton, Edgbaston.

National and international interests
The intermarried Martineau and Lupton clan counted many aldermen and lord mayors, in both Birmingham and Leeds respectively, amongst their kin. Their Unitarian faith and Liberal (Unionist) political beliefs resulted in their combined commitment to many national concerns. For example, Sir Raymond Unwin's concept of the garden suburb greatly interested Robert Francis Martineau and his cousin, Francis Martineau Lupton.

International issues were also of great concern to the family; Robert Francis Martineau welcomed the abolitionist William Lloyd Garrison to his home when the American visited Birmingham on 7 July 1877 and two days later, Martineau's relative, Joseph Lupton, had Garrison as a guest at his Leeds house from 9–15 July.

Lord Mayors of Birmingham
Members included five generations, father to son, of Mayors or Lord Mayors of Birmingham:
Robert Martineau (1798–1870), Mayor of Birmingham, 1846–47
Sir Thomas Martineau (1828–1893), Mayor of Birmingham, 1884–87
Ernest Martineau (1861–1952), Lord Mayor of Birmingham, 1912–14
Sir Wilfrid Martineau (1889–1964), Lord Mayor of Birmingham, 1940–41
Denis Martineau (1920–1999), Lord Mayor of Birmingham, 1986–87

A blue plaque, erected in 2008 by the Birmingham Civic Society in the Council House, commemorates all five.

Catherine, Princess of Wales
Research revealed in 2014 that Catherine, Princess of Wales is a descendant of the Martineau family; her great-grandmother, Olive Middleton (née Lupton) was the daughter of Francis Martineau Lupton (1848–1921), who had attended political conferences in Birmingham with his Martineau alderman cousins.

Legacy
There is a society devoted to the Martineau family of Norwich. "Specifically, the Society aims to highlight the principles of freedom of conscience advocated in the nineteenth century by Harriet Martineau and her brother, Dr. James Martineau".

The National Portrait Gallery holds nearly 20 portraits of James and Harriet Martineau. The siblings' great-nephew, Francis Martineau Lupton, was the great-great-grandfather of Catherine, Princess of Wales, the gallery's patron.

There was a school named after Sir Wilfrid Martineau, now subsumed within the International School, Birmingham.

References

 
English families
Huguenot families
Catherine, Princess of Wales
English Unitarians
Burials at Key Hill Cemetery